Lotte Shopping Co., Ltd. (Hangeul: 롯데쇼핑㈜롯데시네마) is a chain of movie theatres in South Korea. Lotte Cinema is multiplex place in South Korea. Lotte Cinema was established in 1999.

As of January 2018, 112 facilities in Korea are in operation or scheduled to open. The current business division will be divided into Lotte Cinema Co., Ltd. in the future. Since September 2003, Lotte Shopping's Cinema Business Division has been involved in the planning and production of movie imports, distribution, investment projects and performances under the name of Lotte Entertainment.

History 
It was operated by the Cinema Division of Lotte Shopping Co., Ltd., established on September 9, 1999 Lotte Cinema Co., Ltd. ("Lotte Cinema Co., Ltd."), an independent corporation, was newly established on June 14, 2017, and operated by the Cinema Business Division of Lotte Shopping Co., The work is ahead. Originally, Lotte Shopping's Cinema Business Headquarters was originally scheduled to be transferred to Lotte Cinema Co., Ltd. on September 1, 2017. However, the Korean court ruled that "Lotte Shopping will be transferred to Cinema Division headquarters I highly appreciated the goodwill of the business headquarters. " So the schedule was postponed.

The Lotte Cinema Store, which was first opened, opened at Lotte Cinema in Lotte Department Store in Ganghwa-dong, Goyang-si, Gyeonggi-do, Korea in October 1999, It merged with the Lafesta Pavilion near the south of Lotte Department Store Ilsan Branch. Beginning with Lotte Cinema Daejeon in May, 2000, it has established a nationwide network.

Special Auditorium 

 SUPER PLEX G  It is the world's largest screen (34m x 13.8m) listed on the Guinness Book of Records. It is the auditorium with Dolby ATMOS sound system and the first 4K quad screening system in Asia. It is applied to World Tower 21 pipe.
 SUPER PLEX  It is an auditorium with a Dolby ATMOS sound system and a large screen. (Gwangbok 8 & 9 Pavilion / Suwon 1 Pavilion / Gwangmyeong Outlet 1 Pavilion / Merchant 7 Pavilion / Cheongju Lava Pavilion / Eunpyeong 8 Pavilion)
 SUPER S  (World Tower / Centum City)
 SUPER 4D  SUPER 4D that you can actually experience using various effects (Nowon Pavilion 7 / Gongnyeongri Pavilion 3 / Gimpo Airport Pavilion 2 / Ulsan 8th Pavilion 6 / Western Cheongju 6 Pavilion 6 / Pyeongchon Pavilion 7 / World Tower 19 Pavilion / Suwon 7 Pavilion)
 SUPER VIBE  A movie theater with a woofer on the back and waist, which makes it possible to enjoy the visual pleasure and body. (Gassan Digital 2 Pavilion / Gunsan Entrance 5, 6 Pavilion / Jinhae / Ulsan / Pyeongchon 7 Pavilion)

Issue 
On June 5, 2021, Lotte Cinema held an eco-friendly event to celebrate 'Environmental Day'. It is an event that fills the multi-use food containers brought by customers with popcorn. However, as some customers buy unnecessary plastic (ex. large containers), Lotte Cinema's event is criticized for being out of the essence.

See also
CJ CGV, Lotte's main competitor in movie theatre industry
Megabox is a chain of movie theatres in South Korea.

References

External links
  

Cinema
Cinema chains in South Korea
Entertainment companies established in 1999
1999 establishments in South Korea